Paul Turner (born May 10, 1993) is a former American football wide receiver. He played college football at Louisiana Tech. He is currently in his 3rd year of coaching for his alma mater.

Professional career

Philadelphia Eagles
Turner signed with the Philadelphia Eagles as an undrafted free agent in 2016. On September 4, 2016, Turner was waived by the Eagles and was signed to the Eagles practice squad the next day. He was promoted to the active roster on November 21, 2016.

On September 1, 2017, Turner was waived by the Eagles.

New Orleans Saints
On January 5, 2018, Turner signed a reserve/future contract with the New Orleans Saints. He was waived on June 21, 2018.

New England Patriots 
On July 27, 2018, Turner signed with the New England Patriots. He was waived on August 31, 2018.

New Orleans Saints (second stint)
On January 16, 2019, Turner was signed to the New Orleans Saints practice squad, but was released three days later.

Coaching

Turner returned to his alma mater Louisiana Tech as a graduate assistant coach in 2020, moving to defensive analyst in 2021. When Sonny Cumbie was hired as the new head coach, he made Turner into a full-time assistant coach, coaching the Bulldogs' safeties.

References

External links
Philadelphia Eagles bio
Louisiana Tech Bulldogs bio

1993 births
Living people
People from West Monroe, Louisiana
Players of American football from Louisiana
American football wide receivers
Louisiana Tech Bulldogs football players
Philadelphia Eagles players
New Orleans Saints players
New England Patriots players